The 2010 USTA Challenger of Oklahoma was a professional tennis tournament played on hard courts. It was the 18th edition of the tournament which is part of the 2010 ATP Challenger Tour. It took place in Tulsa, United States between 13 and 19 September 2010.

Singles main-draw entrants

Seeds

 Rankings are as of August 30, 2010.

Other entrants
The following players received wildcards into the singles main draw:
  David Martin
  Phillip Simmonds
  Blake Strode
  Mark van Elden

The following players received entry from the qualifying draw:
  Ionuț Beleleu
  Andrei Dăescu
  Oleksandr Nedovyesov
  Fritz Wolmarans

Champions

Singles

 Bobby Reynolds def.  Lester Cook, 6–3, 6–3

Doubles

 Andrew Anderson /  Fritz Wolmarans def.  Brett Joelson /  Chris Klingemann, 6–2, 6–3

External links
Official Site
ITF Search

USTA Challenger of Oklahoma